Aegomorphus morrisi is a species of beetle in the family Cerambycidae. It was described by Uhler in 1855. The species name is often misspelled as morrisii (e.g.) but this spelling is not in prevailing usage and the original spelling (as morrisi) is therefore valid under ICZN Article 33.4.

References

Aegomorphus
Beetles described in 1855